Kuleana rights arose in the mid-1800s and protected the entitlement of Hawaiian tenant farmers and their descendants to, among other things, access landlocked real estate parcels.

In 2012 the Hawaiian Supreme Court confirmed the viability of Kuleana rights in the present day.

In late 2016 Mark Zuckerberg filed suit to eliminate the ownership interests of more than 100 Hawaiians in Kuleana lands. Early in 2017 Mr. Zuckerberg announced that he would drop the litigation.

See also 
 Kuleana Act of 1850
 Ahupuaʻa
 Ceded lands
 Great Māhele
 Hawaiian home land
 Aboriginal title in the United States

References

Further reading 
 Native Hawaiian Land Rights, California Law Review (July 1975)

Real estate in the United States
Indigenous land rights in Hawaii
19th century in Hawaii